Faisal Abdelhassan Antar (born 20 December 1978) is a Lebanese former footballer who played as a defender. He played his entire career in the Lebanese Premier League, for Tadamon Sour, Olympic Beirut, Nejmeh, and Mabarra.

Antar also represented the Lebanese national team at the 2000 AFC Asian Cup, where he had been present for the national team from 1998 to 2007. Faisal is the brother of former footballer Roda Antar. In June 2010, Antar announced his retirement and became a Hall of Famer in the Lebanese Football Association.

Club career
Antar started his senior career at Lebanese Premier League side Tadamon Sour during the 1998–99 season. Antar helped Tadamon win their first Lebanese FA Cup, in 2000–01, after beating Ansar 2–1 in the final. In 2002 Antar moved to Olympic Beirut, winning the domestic double (league and cup) in his first season at the club (2002–03).

After three seasons at Tadamon, Antar moved to Nejmeh in summer of 2005, following a week-long trial in January 2005 at Scottish club Rangers. In his first season at Nejmeh, Antar won the 2005 Lebanese Elite Cup.

In 2007, Antar moved to Mabarra, with whom he won the club's first FA Cup title (2007–08). In 2009 Antar returned to Tadamon Sour, where he remained until 2010, after which he decided to retire from football. In 2011 he withdrew his decision to retire, and played two games for Tadamon during the 2011–12 season.

International career
Antar featured for Lebanon U21 in 1999, in a fixture against the Czech Republic. Antar made his senior international debut for Lebanon on 27 September 1998, at the 1998 Arab Nations Cup; Lebanon lost 4–1 to Saudi Arabia. Antar's first international goal came on 25 April 2001, in a friendly against the Philippines; he helped Lebanon win 3–0.

Personal life 
Faisal Antar is the brother of former Lebanon national team captain Roda Antar.

Career statistics

International
Scores and results list Lebanon's goal tally first.

Honours 
Tadamon Sour
 Lebanese FA Cup: 2000–01

Olympic Beirut
 Lebanese Premier League: 2002–03
 Lebanese FA Cup: 2002–03

Mabarra
 Lebanese FA Cup: 2007–08

Individual
 Lebanese Premier League Team of the Season: 1998–99, 1999–2000, 2000–01, 2001–02, 2004–05, 2005–06

See also
 List of Lebanon international footballers
 List of Lebanon international footballers born outside Lebanon
 List of association football families

References

External links
 
 Faisal Antar at RSSSF
 

1978 births
Living people
Sportspeople from Freetown
Lebanese footballers
Sierra Leonean footballers
Citizens of Lebanon through descent
Lebanese people of Sierra Leonean descent
Sierra Leonean people of Lebanese descent
Sportspeople of Sierra Leonean descent
Sportspeople of Lebanese descent
Association football midfielders
Association football defenders
Tadamon Sour SC players
Olympic Beirut players
Nejmeh SC players
Al Mabarra Club players
Lebanese Premier League players
Lebanon youth international footballers
Lebanon international footballers
Asian Games competitors for Lebanon
Footballers at the 1998 Asian Games
2000 AFC Asian Cup players
Footballers at the 2002 Asian Games